Cadaverine is an organic compound with the formula (CH2)5(NH2)2. Classified as diamine, it is a colorless liquid with an unpleasant odor.  It is present in small quantities in living organisms but is often associated with the putrefaction of animal tissue.

Production
Cadaverine is produced by decarboxylation of lysine. It can be synthesized by many methods including the hydrogenation of glutaronitrile and the reactions of 1,5-dichloropentane.

History
Putrescine and cadaverine were first described in 1885 by the Berlin physician Ludwig Brieger (1849–1919).

Receptors
In zebrafish, the trace amine-associated receptor 13c (or TAAR13c) has been identified as a high-affinity receptor for cadaverine.  In humans, molecular modelling and docking experiments have shown that cadaverine fits into the binding pocket of the human TAAR6 and TAAR8.

Clinical significance
Elevated levels of cadaverine have been found in the urine of some patients with defects in lysine metabolism. The odor commonly associated with bacterial vaginosis has been linked to cadaverine and putrescine.

Derivatives
Pentolinium and pentamethonium.

Toxicity
Acute oral toxicity of cadaverine is 2,000 mg/kg body weight; its no-observed-adverse-effect level is 2,000 ppm (180 mg/kg body weight/day).

See also
 Putrescine
 Skatole

References

External links

GMD MS Spectrum

Diamines
Foul-smelling chemicals